Morne Rouge is a town in Saint George Parish, Grenada.  It is located at the southern end of the island, near its very tip.

References 

Populated places in Grenada